Karen Mok (born Karen Joy Morris, 2 June 1970) is a Hong Kong pop diva who is one of the leading Asian pop singers and actresses with a career spanning three decades. She is the first female Hong Kong singer to win the Golden Melody Award and has won it a total of three times. She has released 17 solo studio albums, starred in over 40 movies, has over 15 million followers on leading Chinese social media site Weibo and holds the Guinness World Record for the Highest Altitude Mass-Attended Music Concert.

Early life
Karen Mok was born on 2 June 1970 as Karen Joy Morris in Hong Kong. She is of mixed ancestry: her mother is half Chinese, quarter German and quarter Persian, while her father is half Welsh and half Chinese. Her grandfather was Alfred Morris, the first principal of King's College, Hong Kong. She speaks English, Cantonese, Mandarin, Italian, German and French.

Mok attended Diocesan Girls' School from primary to secondary grade in Hong Kong. When she was a F.4 student, she received the 1st Hong Kong Outstanding Students Awards. In 1987 she won a scholarship for the United World College of the Adriatic in Duino (Trieste, Italy) from which she graduated in 1989 with the International Baccalaureate. She subsequently studied Italian Literature at Royal Holloway, University of London.

Music career

Albums
While studying in London, Mok auditioned for the West End Musical Miss Saigon. At the same time, she recorded music demo tapes together with fellow students which landed her first recording contract with Star Records. She decided to put her theatre aspirations on hold, headed back to Hong Kong and released in 1993 her first Cantonese album Karen. She achieved her musical breakthrough with the launch of her first Mandarin album To Be in 1997. To date, she has released 17 studio albums, the most successful ones being 做自己 To Be (1997), 全身莫文蔚 Karen Mok in Totality (1995), [i]  (2004),  Without you (2006), 拉活...莫文蔚 L!VE is... KAREN MOK (2007) and HALF TIME (2018) containing numerous number 1 hits such as Ta Bu Ai Wo, 他不愛我, He does not love me, Yin Tian, 陰天, Overcast and Man Man Xihuan Ni, 慢慢喜歡你, Growing fond of you. 

In 2013, she launched her first English album Somewhere I belong, an East-meets-West reinterpretation of jazz classics.  The album is recorded in China with Asian musicians and adding the guzheng on several tracks. She showcased this album at Ronnie Scott's Jazz Club, London, on 30 May 2013. Mok said about the title of the album: “It’s about what I do, when I feel comfortable, that’s when I’m doing what I love most, that’s singing, that’s when I’m performing on stage, and just singing my heart out, sharing my emotions,” she said. “So that’s where I belong.”

Mok has released numerous EPs and compilations and her music has been featured in more than 324 CD compilations.
In 2018 she launched her own music label Mok-a-by-baby records in partnership with Sony Music.

Concerts
In 2000, she gave her debut solo concert The very Karen Mok show in Taipei in front of 20,000 spectators. In 2005, she started her international concert tours with the Extremely Karen Mok Show, followed by The Original Karen Mok Show (2009–2011) and the tour The Age of MOKnificence (2014/2015), with which she celebrated her 20th anniversary in show business. Starting from 2005, she also assumed the role of creative director and producer in her concert tours.

Mok’s most recent concert tours are:

Regardez (2015/2016). This tour started in Taipei and led Mok to 27 cities in Asia, North America, Europe and Australia/New Zealand. As part of this tour, she was the first Chinese pop artist to give solo concerts in Madrid and Milan.Ultimate (2018/2019/2021): This tour started on 23 June 2018 with the concert in the Hongkou Football Stadium in Shanghai 23 June 2018 in front of more than 20,000 spectators and totaled 48 concerts in 40 cities in Asia, Europe and Australia. The tour was largely conducted in outdoor stadiums, with the maximum attendance of 40,000 in the Beijing Workers' Stadium, Beijing, on 22 September 2019. On 12 Oct 2019, she performed in Lhasa (Tibet) at an altitude of 3650m, setting the Guinness World Record for the Highest Altitude Mass-Attended Music Concert and being the first solo stadium concert in Tibet. Her concerts in the Taipei Arena (Taipei) on 07 and 08 Dec 2019 had the special feature that she performed entirely different song lists on each night. The European leg of the tour brought her in London to the Palladium and in Paris to the Folies Bergère, making her the first Chinese pop singer to perform in this venue. With the Ultimate tour, Mok celebrated her 25th anniversary in show business. Interrupted by the events around the global Covid pandemic, the tour finished with three concerts in Hong Kong in June 2021. 

Prior to the Ultimate tour, Mok announced in May 2019, that this would be her last major concert tour as she wants to focus on other artistic activities going forward.

Notable collaborations
Mok has collaborated on stage and in the studio with numerous leading global artists. Amongst others, she performed together with The Black Eyed Peas, Andrea Bocelli, Far East Movement, Lang Lang, John Legend, Sergio Mendes, Mika,  Keanu Reeves and Pharrell Williams.

Acting career

Films
Mok gave her film debut in 1993 with a cameo role in the movie The Tigers – The Legend of Canton. Her first starring role was in 1995 together with Stephen Chow in A Chinese Odyssey. In the same year, she acted in Wong Kar Wai’s movie Fallen Angels, for which she received the award for Best Supporting Actress at the Hong Kong Film Award and the Golden Bauhinia Awards. In total, she starred in more than 40 movies.

Outside Greater China, she acted in the 2004 Hollywood production Around the World in 80 Days with Jackie Chan (credited as Karen Joy Morris, her birth name) and in the Thai horror movie The Coffin. She also played the female lead role in Keanu Reeves’ directorial debut Man of Tai Chi.

Theatre and TV
Throughout her career, Mok has frequently branched into adjacent areas of performances. In 2005/2006, she played the female lead Mimi in the 10th Anniversary Asian Tour of the Broadway musical Rent. In 2001, she supplied the voice of Princess Kida for the Cantonese dub of Walt Disney’s Atlantis: The Lost Empire. In 2020, Mok sang the theme song of the Hong Kong TVB drama Flying Tiger II. The theme song, "呼吸有害, Breathing Is Hazardous", topped all radio, TV and digital platforms in Hong Kong, a first in Cantopop.

In 2016 and 2017, she starred in the two reality TV productions Up Idol (我们来了), of Hunan Television and The Next (天籁之战), season 1 and season 2 (天籁之战 and 天籁之战 (第二季)), of Dragon Television.

On May 20 2021, Mok won the 星耀年度金曲 award with Breathing is Hazardous at Weibo Starlight Awards 2020.

Public image

Special events
She was a torch bearer for the 2008 Summer Olympics held in Beijing  and performed at the opening and closing ceremonies. In 2016, she was awarded the title of Cultural Ambassador of the Italian city of Bergamo, being the first Chinese to be awarded this title.

Brands

In October 2008, she launched her own line of perfume. Starting in 2015, she collaborated with the Italian brand Rucoline, also developing her own designs. In the following year, she initiated a crossover collection with Replay, leading up to a launch event and pop-up store at Harvey Nichols in London in 2018.Mok has been the face of leading global brands such as Cadillac, Canon, Cartier, Chow Tai Fook, Clear, Kappa, Lux, Mandarin Oriental, Schwarzkopf, Schweppes and Solvil et Titus.

Activism and charity
Mok is a strong advocate for animals and has been involved in numerous campaigns for this purpose. Amongst others, she has joined efforts with Animals Asia to help Asiatic black bears which are exploited for the extraction of bile, and has been on an expedition with Society for the Prevention of Cruelty to Animals (SPCA) to demonstrate against the culling of baby seals. She has also been involved with People for the Ethical Treatment of Animals (PETA).

In 2007, Mok was involved with MTV EXIT, a campaign against human trafficking in Asia, presenting Traffic: An MTV EXIT Special, a documentary on trafficking. In 2013 she championed in the campaign Roll Back Malaria (RBM).

Mok currently serves as an ambassador for UNICEF, SPCA, Animals Asia Foundation and Care for Children.

In 2017, Mok announced the creation of the Morris Charity Initiative, providing support in animal welfare, education and the environment. As a first initiative, the charity raised money for a scholarship at the United World College Changshu.

Personal life
Mok married her boyfriend, German-born Johannes Natterer, at a church near Florence, Italy, on 1 October 2011. Mok has three adult step-children and spends her time between London and her international engagements. In 2017, they celebrated their sixth wedding anniversary with an elaborate party at Kensington Palace.

Filmography

Discography

Albums

EPs

鍾情爵士樂 Vol.1

Singles

Compilations

Soundtracks

Awards and nominations

References

External links

 

1970 births
Living people
Alumni of University College London
Alumni of the University of London
21st-century Hong Kong women singers
Hong Kong film actresses
Hong Kong Mandopop singers
Hong Kong women singer-songwriters
Hong Kong television actresses
20th-century Hong Kong actresses
21st-century Hong Kong actresses
Hong Kong mezzo-sopranos
Hong Kong philanthropists
Hong Kong people of British descent
Hong Kong people of Welsh descent
Hong Kong people of German descent
Hong Kong people of Chinese descent
Hong Kong people of Iranian descent
UNICEF Goodwill Ambassadors
People educated at a United World College
20th-century Hong Kong women singers